The 2020 West Virginia gubernatorial election was held on November 3, 2020, to elect the Governor of West Virginia, concurrently with the 2020 U.S. presidential election, as well as elections to the United States Senate, elections to the United States House of Representatives and various state and local elections.

Incumbent Republican Governor Jim Justice announced his 2020 re-election campaign on January 7, 2019. Justice was elected in 2016 as a Democrat, but later switched back to the Republican Party in a campaign rally with Donald Trump. Justice won re-election to a second term, defeating the Democratic nominee, Kanawha County commissioner Ben Salango. Justice's re-election made him the first Republican to be elected governor of West Virginia since Cecil Underwood in 1996. Additionally, Justice became the first incumbent Republican governor to win re-election since Arch A. Moore Jr. in 1972, as well as the first Republican to carry all counties in West Virginia. However, Justice performed worse than Republican presidential candidate Donald Trump, who outperformed Justice by 5.13 percentage points. Additionally, Ben Salango slightly outperformed Biden by 0.53 percentage points.

Republican primary

Candidates

Nominee
Jim Justice, incumbent Governor

Eliminated in primary
Shelby Jean Fitzhugh, retiree
Michael Folk, former state delegate
Brooke Lunsford, insurance agent
Chuck Sheedy, U.S. Army veteran
Doug Six, surveyor
Woody Thrasher, former West Virginia Secretary of Commerce (2017–2018)

Declined
Mac Warner, Secretary of State of West Virginia (running for re-election)
David McKinley, incumbent U.S. Representative for West Virginia's 1st congressional district (running for re-election)

Polling

Results

Democratic primary

Candidates

Nominee
Ben Salango, Kanawha County commissioner

Eliminated in primary
 Stephen Smith, community organizer
Ron Stollings, state senator
 Jody Murphy, businessman
Douglas Hughes, environmental permit writer for West Virginia Department of Environmental Protection

Declined
 Booth Goodwin, former United States Attorney and candidate for Governor of West Virginia in 2016
Joe Manchin, incumbent U.S. Senator and former Governor of West Virginia

Endorsements

Polling

Results

Other candidates

Mountain Party
The Mountain Party received over 5% of the vote in 2016 with former State Senator and Delegate Charlotte Pritt as the party's gubernatorial nominee. The party nominates its candidate for governor by convention per its bylaws.

Nominee
 Daniel Lutz, Eastern Panhandle Conservation District Supervisor representing Jefferson County, and Commissioned U.S. Air Force Veteran

Endorsements

Libertarian Party

Nominee
 Erika Kolenich, trial attorney

Write-ins
The following candidates are certified write-in candidates.

Declared
 Quintin Gerard Caldwell
 Michael Folk, former State Delegate (sought the nomination of the Republican Party)
 Kimberly Gross
 Mitch Roberts
 Marshall Wilson, State Delegate (Independent)

General election

Predictions

Endorsements

Polling

Jim Justice vs. Joe Manchin

Results

Notes

 Partisan clients

References

External links
 
 
  (State affiliate of the U.S. League of Women Voters)
 

Official campaign websites
 Jim Justice (R) for Governor 
 Ben Salango (D) for Governor
 Daniel Lutz (M) for Governor
 Erika Kolenich (L) for Governor
 Michael Folk (I) for Governor
 S. Marshall Wilson (I) for Governor

West Virginia
2020
Governor